Urja Stadium is located in Rajbansi Nagar, Patna, Bihar, India. This stadium is known for hosting Ranji Trophy matches. This Stadium Hosts Cricket and Football.

References 

Patna district